Competitor for  Turkey

Halit Balamir (1922 – 2 March 2009) was a Turkish sport wrestler. He was born in Gümüşhane He won a silver medal in freestyle wrestling, flyweight class, at the 1948 Summer Olympics in London.

References

External links
 

1922 births
2009 deaths
Sportspeople from Gümüşhane
Wrestlers at the 1948 Summer Olympics
Turkish male sport wrestlers
Olympic wrestlers of Turkey
Olympic silver medalists for Turkey
Olympic medalists in wrestling
Medalists at the 1948 Summer Olympics
20th-century Turkish people
21st-century Turkish people